Vincent Hognon (born 16 August 1974) is a French professional football manager and former player who played as a defender.

He spent his playing career in Ligue 1 and Ligue 2 at Nancy, Saint-Étienne and Nice. He managed Nancy, Metz and Grenoble in Ligue 2, winning the title with the second club in 2018–19 and then leading them in Ligue 1.

Playing career
Born in Nancy, Hognon started his career at hometown club Nancy in Ligue 2, making his debut during the 1993–94 season. He played a total of nine seasons with the club, three of them in Ligue 1, before moving to Saint-Étienne, who had recently been relegated to Ligue 2 following a fake passport scandal. However, the club won promotion during his second season there, and Hognon became a key member of the side during their past three seasons in the top division. During the summer 2007, he signed for Nice, where he played until hanging up his boots in 2009.

Managerial career

Nancy
Hognon became assistant manager of Nancy in January 2013, working alongside Patrick Gabriel. On 30 August 2017, he succeeded Pablo Correa as manager, as the team had not won any of the first five games of the Ligue 2 season. On his debut eight days later, the team won 3–0 at home to Valenciennes. After four wins in 17 games, he was dismissed by the 17th-placed team on 22 January.

Metz
In August 2018, Hognon was hired at Nancy's local rivals Metz as an assistant to Frédéric Antonetti. When Antonetti returned to his native Corsica on short notice due to his wife's illness, Antonetti became interim manager, beginning his term on 17 December with a 2–0 win at Valenciennes. After winning promotion to Ligue 1 as champions, he was confirmed as coach while his predecessor became general manager.

Hognon's first Ligue 1 game as manager was a 1–1 draw at Strasbourg on 11 August 2019. The season was abandoned with ten games remaining due to the COVID-19 pandemic, with Metz in 15th. On 12 October 2020, Antonetti – widowed in July – replaced Hognon, who declined the opportunity to remain as assistant.

Hesperange
On 22 June 2021, Hognon was hired on a contract of undisclosed length by Hesperange, who had finished the previous season third in the Luxembourg National Division. His first game was his first in European competition, a 1–0 loss at Slovenia's Domžale on 8 July in the UEFA Europa Conference League first qualifying round, followed a week later by elimination after a 1–1 draw in the second leg. He was fired on 19 September, having won three and drawn two of six league games.

Grenoble
Hognon returned to Ligue 2 on 29 December 2021, being hired by 16th-placed Grenoble. He missed his debut, a 1–0 loss at home to Auxerre on 8 January, due to COVID; eight days later he led the team to a goalless draw away to Guingamp. The team finished the season in 15th.

Managerial statistics

Honours

Player
Nancy
Division 2: 1997–98

Saint-Étienne
Ligue 2: 2003–04

Manager
Metz
Ligue 2: 2018–19

References

External links

Vincent Hognon at OGC Nice 

1974 births
Living people
Sportspeople from Nancy, France
Footballers from Grand Est
French footballers
Association football central defenders
AS Nancy Lorraine players
AS Saint-Étienne players
OGC Nice players
Ligue 1 players
Ligue 2 players
French football managers
AS Nancy Lorraine managers
FC Metz managers
Grenoble Foot 38 managers
Ligue 1 managers
Ligue 2 managers
FC Swift Hesperange managers
French expatriate football managers
Expatriate football managers in Luxembourg
French expatriate sportspeople in Luxembourg
FC Metz non-playing staff